Waskom Independent School District is a public school district based in Waskom, Texas (USA).

In 2009, the school district was rated "academically acceptable" by the Texas Education Agency.

Schools
Waskom High (Grades 9-12)
Waskom Middle (Grades 6-8)
Waskom Elementary (Grades PK-4)

References

External links
Waskom ISD

School districts in Harrison County, Texas